Albert Ramos chose to defend his last year's title and reached the semifinals, where he lost to his compatriot and eventual champion Daniel Gimeno-Traver. 26-years-old player won the title, defeating Rubén Ramírez Hidalgo 6–3, 6–3 in the final.

Seeds

Draw

Finals

Top half

Bottom half

References
 Main Draw
 Qualifying Draw

2011
Singles